Sangareddy district, is a district in the Indian state of Telangana. This district contains a part of the Hyderabad Metropolitan Region. The district shares boundaries with Medak, Medchal, Vikarabad, Kamareddy and Rangareddy districts and with the state boundary of Karnataka.

Geography 

Demographics 
 Census of India, the district has a population of 1,495,503. Scheduled Castes and Scheduled Tribes are 17.96% and 5.70% of the population respectively.

Hindus are 81.44% while Muslims are 16.15% and Christians are 1.56% of the population.

Language

Administrative divisions 
The district has four revenue divisions of Narayankhed, Sangareddy, Zaheerabad, Andole–Jogipet which are sub-divided into 27 mandals. M. Hanumantha Rao is the present collector of the district.

Mandals

See also 
 List of districts in Telangana

References

External links 

 
Districts of Telangana
2016 establishments in Telangana